The 1923–24 season was the 24th season of competitive football in Belgium. Beerschot AC won their second Division I title. At the end of the season, RC de Malines, CS Verviétois and RFC Liégeois were relegated to the Promotion, while  and SC Anderlechtois, FC Malinois and White Star AC were promoted.

National team

* Belgium score given first

Key
 H = Home match
 A = Away match
 N = On neutral ground
 F = Friendly
 OR2 = Summer Olympics second round
 o.g. = own goal

Honours

Final league tables

Division I

Promotion

Promotion A

Promotion B

|}
White Star AC were promoted to First Division.

External links
RSSSF archive - Final tables 1895-2002
Belgian clubs history